Vikram Deb Autonomous College (Formerly 'Jeypore College') is an autonomous college of Berhampur University in India, located in the city of Jeypore, Koraput district in Odisha, that offers courses primarily at the higher secondary, undergraduate and postgraduate levels. It was established in 1947 by Maharaja of Jeypore Sri Vikram Dev IV or Vikram Deo Verma and has been named in his respect.

History

Foundation

As a part of welfare activities of the British-Indian government, in 1 July 1947 the government of Jeypore Estate (Orissa Province) under Maharaja Vikram Deo Verma started this institution of higher education at Jeypore as 'Jeypore College'. As a tribute to his philanthrophy the college was renamed to 'Vikram Deb College' in 1961. The college was also upgraded to a first grade college from 1961 and undergraduate courses were started. Honours teaching provisions were made in 1968–73 and Post Graduate courses were started from 1979. The college was declared a lead college in 1991–92.

Present 
The courses at the higher secondary level are affiliated to CHSE Board of Odisha and the courses at the undergraduate and the postgraduate level are offered in affiliation with Berhampur University, Berhampur, Odisha. It got its autonomous institution status in 2004. It is recognised by the University Grant Commission (UGC) of India and enjoys the status of a B++ Grade college as assessed by the NAAC. Notable Alumni and Students of Vikram Deb College are also called as 'Vikramites'.

See also
 Higher education in Orissa
 Jeypore

References

External links
 Vikram Deb Autonomous College

Department of Higher Education, Odisha
Universities and colleges in Odisha
Koraput district
Educational institutions established in 1947
1947 establishments in India
Colleges in India
Autonomous Colleges of Odisha